Airports of Thailand Public Company Limited (AOT) is a Thai public company. It manages Thailand's six international airports and will add four more airports in 2019. In 2018, it became the most-valuable airport operator in the world.

Thailand's 28 regional airports are managed by the Department of Airports, a separate agency.

AOT was established on September 20, 2002, as a result of the privatisation of the state-owned Airports Authority of Thailand (AAT). At that time, the company was worth 14,285,700,000 baht. The Thai government held, and still holds, 70 percent of the company's stock. During fiscal year 2014 AOT's average daily market capitalization was 282,321 million baht.

AOT's fiscal year (FY) runs from 1 October–30 September, thus AOT's FY2018 was from 1 October 2017 – 30 September 2018.

History 
Thai aviation began in 1911 when Belgian pilot, Van den Born (Van den Born), brought the Orville Wright aircraft to show between February 2–8, 1911 at Sa Pathum Horse Racing Course, now known as the Royal Bangkok Sports Club. After that, Thailand took an interest in having airplanes for the protection and transportation of the nation. They sent three military officers to study aviation in France on February 28, 1911. Those officers were Major Luang Sakdi Sanlayawut (Sunee Suwanprateep), Captain Luang Arwut Sikikorn (Long Sinsuk), and First Lieutenant Tip Ketuthat.

After having completed their training, they returned with eight airplanes in 1913, which the Thai government had ordered. They also tested the airplane’s flight performance in front of the Thai people on December 29, 1913 at the same airport, Sa Pathum Airport. Due to the success of the three military officers at that time, the army planned to build a specific military airfield and other buildings such as hangars. However, because Sa Pathum Airport was constructed in an unsuitable location, The Royal Thai Army Aviation and Aviation School chose a new location based on the conditions of having a spacious area, high ground, no flooding, and away from the  Phra Nakhon area. In the end, Don Mueang was chosen for all those requirements instead of Sa Pathum as it was quite small.

Therefore, Don Mueang was chosen as the new location and thus became the "Don Mueang Airport". On the morning of March 8, 1914, the airplanes took off from Sa Pathum Airport for the last time and flew into Don Mueang Airport for the first time. The airport was officially opened on March 27, 1914. In 1940, the Air Force established the Civil Aviation Division to carry out operations on international aviation. Eight years later, it was upgraded from a division to a department. They renovated the Don Mueang Airport to be an international airport and changed the official name to "Bangkok Airport" on June 21, 1955. Subsequently, the National Assembly enacted the Act on Airports of Thailand, B.E. 2522, requiring the establishment of an airport authority. The Airport Authority of Thailand, abbreviated as AAT, was formed from the act. AOT has been in operation under said act since July 1, 1979, and is considered the founding day of AOT. The AOT has expanded to four more international regions by shifting its management approach to a commercial one, namely Chiang Mai, Hat Yai, Phuket, and Chiang Rai (Currently, it changed to the new name "Mae Fah Luang Chiang Rai Airport" on March 13, 2010).

After that, Don Mueang Airport grew into a thriving business, and it became an international airport. The Sa Pathum airfield, previously used as the main field, was replaced by the Suvarnabhumi airport on September 28, 2006. During the same time, AOT came to administrate Suvarnabhumi. In the following years, Bangkok airport's name was changed back to Don Mueang Airport on March 13, 2007. The Suvarnabhumi Airport's buildings and facilities were renovated to increase efficiency and responsiveness to travelers' needs. This resulted in success and rapid progress. Suvarnabhumi Airport became one of the main airports in Thailand which have more than 40 million global travelers each year. And they have their own domestic airlines all about eight airlines.

Statistics 
Thailand's six AOT airports saw growth in passenger traffic of 21.3 percent in 2015, setting a new record of just under 110 million passengers. Aircraft movements—take-offs and landings—grew in tandem by 16.6 percent from the previous year to 727,750. The growth is expected to continue through 2016 with AOT projecting an 11 percent increase in combined passenger throughput. Air freight moved through the airports remained largely stagnant in 2015, with a marginal 0.63 percent increase to 1.38 million tonnes, reflecting sluggish global trade.Six years later, there had around 20 million people traveled through airports in Thailand in 2021. In that year ,the number of people of both international and domestic flights decreased from the previous years by the COVID-19 pandemic. By attempt to expand the tourism industry and even domestic air transportation, the Thai government recently announced that visitors from low-risk countries can visit Thailand without being quarantined. Currently,Suvarnabhumi airport in Thailand registered the highest number of total air passengers among other airports, amounting to approximately 14.6 million passengers from October 2021 to July 2022. In that same period, there were around 36 million air passengers in all airports in the country.

Plans 

Airports are a key infrastructure of the air transport system, contributing to 7% of the United States' gross domestic product. However, the construction of an airport requires a high investment cost, in addition to the cost of maintenance and the cost of developing the airport in order to meet safety and security standards.

In the past, Thailand had no plans for airport development planning, thus unable to meet the demand to its full potential. In addition, the province The airport has not requested the construction of an airport in the area. To provide Thailand with guidelines for developing existing airports and constructing new airports to meet increasing demand by dividing the airports in Thailand into 4 groups to determine the development guidelines.

Strategic Goal 
The vision “Airport System Connecting and Driving the Development of the Country” sets out the vision and strategic goals for the 20-year development in line with the 20-year national strategy formulated by the government. It will promote the achievement of the policy of being the center of the country's aviation.

In order to provide a clear and continuous long-term development direction, the development target is set in four phases.

Phase 1 (2017 - 2021)[edit] 
Elevate closer to the ability to support the volume of traffic congestion with development goals that focusing on Improve the capacity to handle air traffic and transport to meet both short- and long-term needs.

Phase 2 (2022 - 2026)[edit] 
Elevate closer to the ability to curse with the goal of development which emphasizes on creating a mechanism that promotes the upgrading of the airport business's competitiveness, encouraging airport operators at all levels to focus on operating development.

Phase 3 (2027 - 2031)[edit] 
Leading Airport of Innovation with the goal of developing focusing on creating a culture of innovation that is practical and continually developed.

Phase 4 (2032 - 2036)[edit] 
Airport of Sustainability with development goals that emphasis is placed on building the sustainability of airports to have an airport system that continuously develops products that produce results that meet the goals that can drive social, economic and environmental development.

References

External links

 Google finance, Airports of Thailand

Airport operators
Airports in Thailand
Transport companies established in 2002
Companies based in Bangkok
Government-owned companies of Thailand
Companies listed on the Stock Exchange of Thailand
Thai companies established in 2002
Civil aviation in Thailand
SET50 Index